Mount Willard, elevation , is a mountain located in Carroll County, New Hampshire, United States. The summit is located in the town of Hart's Location in Crawford Notch State Park. The summit provides excellent views and is accessible via the Mount Willard Trail.

Dogs are able to use this trail, and it has been rated as child friendly.

References

Mountains of Carroll County, New Hampshire
Mountains of New Hampshire
Tourist attractions in Carroll County, New Hampshire